Porto Alexandre, occasionally known in English as Port Alexander, is a bay in Angola. It is located in the Namibe Province.

Geography
Porto Alexandre is a very well-sheltered bay of the South Atlantic Ocean. Saco da Baleia is a bay located west of the western end of the spit.

The town of Tômbua is located on the southern shore of the bay. It was formerly a whaling port, but currently it is an important harbor for oil production and fishing in the area. The port has refrigeration facilities installed with European Union assistance at the Tombwa canning factory.

See also
 List of lighthouses in Angola
 Geography of Angola

References

Bays of the Atlantic Ocean
Bays of Angola